Kinkoji unshiu (Citrus obovoidea × unshiu) is a Citrus hybrid cultivated for its edible fruit.

Genetics
Kinkoji unshiu is a graft hybrid between the kinkoji (Citrus obovoidea) and the satsuma mandarin (Citrus unshiu).

Distribution
It is cultivated and occurs naturally in Japan and is also grown in California.

Description
The fruit is moderately large (around the size of a grapefruit) and pomelo-like in shape. The rind is of a medium thickness (slightly thinner than that of a pomelo) and is pale to dark yellow in color. The flesh is bright orange in color and moderately seedy. The tree is densely branched and the leaves are leathery and ovate to elliptical in shape. The flesh is juicy and has been described as having a pleasant flavor but rather mild and flat. It has been cultivated for over 70 years.

Availability
It is commercially available in the United States through the Citrus Clonal Protection Program.

See also
Kobayashi mikan
Japanese citrus
List of citrus fruits

References

Citrus
Citrus hybrids
Fruit trees
Edible fruits
Japanese fruit
Fruits originating in East Asia
Flora of Japan